Donald O'Neal Lassetter (born March 27, 1933) is an American former professional baseball player. The outfielder appeared in four Major League Baseball games as a member of the  St. Louis Cardinals, but spent the remainder of his eight-season career in minor league baseball.

His 13-at-bat Major League trial with the 1957 Cardinals occurred after he hit 27 home runs and knocked home 84 runs batted in for Triple-A Omaha of the American Association. His two MLB hits included a triple off Dick Drott of the Chicago Cubs on September 27, 1957.

References

External links
Career statistics from Baseball Reference
Venezuelan Professional Baseball League statistics

1933 births
Living people
Albany Cardinals players
Allentown Cardinals players
Baseball players from Georgia (U.S. state)
Columbus Cardinals players
Houston Buffaloes players
Indianapolis Indians players
Leones del Caracas players
American expatriate baseball players in Venezuela
Little Rock Travelers players
Louisville Colonels (minor league) players
Lynchburg Cardinals players
Major League Baseball outfielders
Omaha Cardinals players
People from Newnan, Georgia
Rochester Red Wings players
Sacramento Solons players
Sportspeople from the Atlanta metropolitan area
St. Louis Cardinals players
Winston-Salem Cardinals players